Cumberland Valley Railroad Station and Station Master's House, also known as the Mechanicsburg Railroad Station, is a historic railway station and house located at Mechanicsburg in Cumberland County, Pennsylvania. The station was erected about 1875 by the Cumberland Valley Railroad.  It is a 1 1/2-story, brick building with a gable roof.  It measures 52 feet by 27 feet.  The station master's house is located adjacent to the station, and is a 2 1/2-story, brick building with a gable roof.

It was listed on the National Register of Historic Places in 1978.

The building now serves as the main museum and headquarters of the Mechanicsburg Museum Association.

References

External links
 Mechanicsburg Museum - official site

Railway stations on the National Register of Historic Places in Pennsylvania
Transport infrastructure completed in 1875
Buildings and structures in Cumberland County, Pennsylvania
Museums in Cumberland County, Pennsylvania
National Register of Historic Places in Cumberland County, Pennsylvania
Railroad museums in Pennsylvania